The following are the national records in athletics in Papua New Guinea maintained by PNG's national athletics federation: Athletics Papua New Guinea.

Outdoor

Key to tables:

h = hand timing

Mx = mixed race

A = affected by altitude

NWI = no wind measurement

OT = oversized track (> 200m in circumference)

y = denotes one mile

# = not ratified by federation

Men

Women

Indoor

Men

Women

References

External links
 Athletics Papua New Guinea
 Papua New Guinea Records

Papua New Guinea
Records
Athletics
Athletics